The men's pole vault competition at the 2004 Summer Olympics in Athens was held at the Olympic Stadium on 25–27 August. Thirty-nine athletes from 25 nations competed. The event was won by Timothy Mack of the United States, the nation's 18th victory in the men's pole vault. Toby Stevenson took silver, making it the second consecutive Games that Americans finished 1st and 2nd. Giuseppe Gibilisco's bronze was Italy's first medal in the event.

Summary

With a first attempt clearance at 5.85m, Giuseppe Gibilisco went into 5.90m with the lead. Tim Mack and Toby Stevenson were the only others to clear 5.85m, both on their second attempt, but Stevenson had the advantage because Mack had an earlier miss. But the medals were not settled because Igor Pavlov saved one attempt for 5.90m. Stevenson and Mack both made it on their first attempt, while Pavlov missed to be eliminated and Gibilisco missed his first. The only way to unseat Stevenson was a clearance, but nobody could negotiate 5.95 in their first two attempts, leaving Gibilisco with bronze. On his final attempt, Mack slithered over a personal best for the second time in the competition. It was also a new Olympic record. Stevenson put on his helmet to take one last attempt but the bar dragged off, giving Mack the gold.

Background

This was the 25th appearance of the event, which is one of 12 athletics events to have been held at every Summer Olympics. The returning finalists from the 2000 Games were fifth-place finisher (and 1996 finalist) Dmitriy Markov of Australia, seventh-place finisher Okkert Brits of South Africa, eighth-place finisher Danny Ecker of Germany, tenth-place finishers Giuseppe Gibilisco of Italy and Aleksandr Averbukh of Israel, and thirteenth-place finisher Tim Lobinger of Germany. Markov had won the 2001 world championship, with Gibilisco winning in 2003. For the first time in decades, Sergey Bubka was not favored—if only because he had retired in 2001.

Slovenia made its men's pole vaulting debut; Uzbekistan entered a vaulter, but he did not start. The United States made its 24th appearance, most of any nation, having missed only the boycotted 1980 Games.

Qualification

The qualification period for Athletics was 1 January 2003 to 9 August 2004. For the men's pole vault, each National Olympic Committee was permitted to enter up to three athletes that had vaulted 5.65 metres or higher during the qualification period. The maximum number of athletes per nation had been set at 3 since the 1930 Olympic Congress. If an NOC had no athletes that qualified under that standard, one athlete that had vaulted 5.55 metres or higher could be entered.

Competition format

The competition consisted of two rounds, qualification and final. Athletes start with a qualifying round. Jumping in turn, each athlete attempts to achieve the qualifying height. If they fail at three jumps in a row, they are eliminated. After a successful jump, they receive three more attempts to achieve the next height. Once all jumps have been completed, all athletes who have achieved the qualifying height go through to the final. If fewer than 12 athletes achieve the qualifying standard, the best 12 athletes go through. Cleared heights reset for the final, which followed the same format until all athletes fail three consecutive jumps.

Records

, the existing world and Olympic records were as follows.

Timothy Mack was the only man to clear 5.95 metres in Athens, winning the gold medal and setting a new Olympic record.

Schedule

All times are Greece Standard Time (UTC+2)

Results

Qualifying round

Rule: Qualifying standard 5.70 (Q) or at least best 12 qualified (q).

Final

References

External links
Official Olympic Report

M
Pole vault at the Olympics
Men's events at the 2004 Summer Olympics